Henry Emanuel Cohen (1 December 1840 – 5 January 1912) was a judge and politician in New South Wales, Australia.

Cohen was born in Port Macquarie, New South Wales, the second son of Abraham Cohen of Sydney, and entered as a student at the Middle Temple in October 1868. In 1848 he family moved and in 1855 they moved to Goulburn where Cohen attended private school In 1856 at age 16 he stated to work as a clerk at David Cohen and Company, first in Sydney then moved to  West Maitland  until he resigned in 1864. He went into business with his twin brother George opened a store in Bathurst until it was closed in 1867.  In June 1871 he was called to the English bar, and returned to Sydney, where he was admitted to the local bar. On his return to Sydney was boat shipwrecked at Gallen 1 November 1971 and has returned on streamer "Rangoon".  On  15th December 1871 he was asmiitted to New South Wales Bar.

On 21 December 1874 Cohen was elected for West Maitland in the New South Wales Legislative Assembly. He was Colonial Treasurer in the James Farnell Ministry from December 1877 to December 1878. In May 1881 he was appointed District Court Judge for the Sydney Metropolitan and Coast District, but resigned the position, and re-entered politics, being Minister of Justice in the Alexander Stuart Cabinet from January 1883 to October 1885.

Cohen was appointed acting judge of the Supreme Court of New South Wales on 19 July 1895, and in 1896 accepted an offer of a permanent position on the bench. Cohen was inaugural president of the Arbitration Court, 1 April 1902 to 3 July 1905.

Fanny, Lady Benjamin (c. 1839 – 18 February 1912), wife of Sir Benjamin Benjamin, MLC and mayor of Melbourne, was a sister.

In December 1910 he decided to leave absence from Supreme Court. In March 1911 he departed Sydney  to visit England, France and Germany.On 5th January 1912 he died  on board the SS' Friedrich der Grosse'. He is buried at Rookwood Cemetery, Sydney.

References

External links
 

1840 births
1912 deaths
Judges of the Supreme Court of New South Wales
Colony of New South Wales judges
Judges of the District Court of NSW
19th-century Australian judges
20th-century Australian judges
Members of the New South Wales Legislative Assembly
Australian Jews
Treasurers of New South Wales